Schistura imitator is a species of ray-finned fish in the stone loach genus Schistura which has only been recorded from rapids and stony reaches of the Kong River in Laos.

References 

I
Fish described in 2000